Zapus is a genus of North American jumping mouse. It is the only genus whose members have the dental formula . Zapus are the only extant mammals aside from the Aye-aye with a total of 18 teeth.

This genus was first separated from Old World jerboas by Coues in 1875.  Members of this genus are very similar in appearance, all species having long tails, long hind feet and yellowish-brown pelage above and white below, the colors distinctly separated by a yellowish-orange lateral line.

Taxonomy
The genus contains eight extant species. At least some of these subspecies designations are thought to be tenuous:
Northern meadow jumping mouse, Zapus hudsonius
Zapus hudsonius acadicus
Zapus hudsonius adamsi
Zapus hudsonius alascensis
Zapus hudsonius americanus
Zapus hudsonius campestris
Zapus hudsonius canadensis
Zapus hudsonius hudsonius
Zapus hudsonius preblei
Zapus hudsonius transitionalis
Southern meadow jumping mouse, Zapus luteus
Zapus luteus luteus
Zapus luteus pallidus
Central Pacific jumping mouse, Zapus montanus
Zapus montanus eureka
Zapus montanus montanus
Zapus montanus orarius (Pt. Reyes Jumping Mouse?)
Oregon jumping mouse, Zapus oregonus
Zapus oregonus cinereus
Zapus oregonus curtatus
Zapus oregonus oregonus
South Pacific jumping mouse, Zapus pacificus
Southwestern jumping mouse, Zapus princeps
Zapus princeps chysogenys
Zapus princeps princeps
Northwestern jumping mouse, Zapus saltator
Zapus saltator saltator
Zapus saltator idahoensis
Zapus saltator kootenayensis
Zapus saltator minor
North Pacific jumping mouse, Zapus trinotatus

The Okanogan Valley jumping mouse (Zapus okanoganensis), which is restricted to the Okanogan Valley and the eastern slopes of the Cascade Range, was described in 2017. Although it is definitely thought to be a distinct species, it has not yet been properly published and is thus considered a nomen nudum, and is tentatively classified in Z. saltator until that happens. A number of fossil species are also known, with the oldest being Zapus rinkeri from the Blancan of Kansas.

In popular culture
The Linux distribution Ubuntu named its version 17.04 after the small creature, giving it the codename Zesty Zapus.

References

Allen, J. A. 1900. The North-American Jumping Mice. The American Naturalist, 34:399, pp. 199–202.

 
Taxa named by Elliott Coues
Rodent genera